Krymsky District is an administrative district (raion), one of the thirty-eight in Krasnodar Krai, Russia. As a municipal division, it is incorporated as Krymsky Municipal District. It is located in the west of the krai. Its administrative center is the town of Krymsk (which is not administratively a part of the district). Population:

Administrative and municipal status
Within the framework of administrative divisions, Krymsky District is one of the thirty-eight in the krai. The town of Krymsk serves as its administrative center, despite being incorporated separately as an administrative unit with the status equal to that of the districts.

As a municipal division, the district is incorporated as Krymsky Municipal District, with the Town of Krymsk, together with the khutor of Verkhneadagum in Nizhnebakansky Rural Okrug, being incorporated within it as Krymskoye Urban Settlement.

References

Notes

Sources

Districts of Krasnodar Krai
